The women's team round event was part of the archery programme at the 1904 Summer Olympics. The competition took place on 21 September 1904 at Francis Field. Only one team, consisting of four archers from the hosts United States, appears to have competed. The International Olympic Committee credits that team with gold medals.

Background
This was the first appearance of a women's team event; team events would not return again until 1988 (though in a different format). The 1904 Olympic archery events were part of the 26th Grand Annual Target Meeting of the National Archery Association, with competition open to international competitors though none actually competed. It was thus largely an American national championship, though the International Olympic Committee recognizes the winners as Olympic medalists. The women's team round in particular has been debated as to whether it was Olympic. Early sources listed it, but later sources excluded it based on its not appearing on the original result sheets and thus assuming it was not actually contested. However, scores are provided in contemporary publications (the 1906 Spalding Archery Guide and 1909 Archer's Register), leading most recent scholars to include it.

Competition format
The competition featured four-woman teams, with each archer shooting 96 arrows at 50 yards. The total for the team was thus 384 arrows. All four individual scores were summed to give a team score.

Schedule 
The team events—both women and men—were held on the third day of the three-day archery tournament.

Results

References

External links
 International Olympic Committee medal winners database
 De Wael, Herman. Herman's Full Olympians: "Archery 1904".

Women's team round
1904 in women's sport
Arch